Elections to Carmarthen District Council were held in May 1983.  It was preceded by the 1979 election and followed by the 1987 election. On the same day there were elections to the other local authorities and community councils in Wales.

Results

Abergwili and Llanllawddog (one seat)

Abernant (one seat)

Carmarthen Town Ward One (four seats)

Carmarthen Town Ward Two (two seats)

Carmarthen Town Ward Three (three seats)

Cilymaenllwyd (one seat)

Cynwyl Elfed and Llanpumsaint (one seat)

Henllanfallteg (one seat)

Laugharne Township (two seats)

Llanarthney and Llanddarog (three seats)

Llandyfaelog (two seats)

Llangeler (two seats)

Llanfihangel-ar-Arth (one seat)

Llanfihangel Rhos-y-Corn (one seat)

Llangain (one seat)

Llangynnwr (two seats)

Llangyndeyrn (two seats)

Llanllwni (two seats)

Newcastle Emlyn (one seat)

St Clears (two seats)

Whitland (one seat)

References

Carmarthen District Council elections
Carmarthen District Council election
20th century in Carmarthenshire